Tomaso Staiti di Cuddia delle Chiuse (2 December 1932 – 1 March 2017) was an Italian journalist and politician.

References

1932 births
2017 deaths
People from Vercelli
Italian Social Movement politicians
Tricolour Flame politicians
National Front (Italy, 1997) politicians
The Right (Italy) politicians
Future and Freedom politicians
Deputies of Legislature VIII of Italy
Deputies of Legislature IX of Italy
Deputies of Legislature X of Italy
Politicians of Piedmont
Italian journalists
Italian male journalists